The ceremonial county of Staffordshire (which includes the area of the Stoke-on-Trent unitary authority) is divided into 12 seats - 4 borough and 8 county constituencies. Staffordshire is a county in the West Midlands of England. At the 2019 general election, for the first time in history all of Staffordshire's elected MPs were Conservatives.

Constituencies

At the 2017 General Election, the Conservative Party (its candidates) made a net gain of one seat by gaining Stoke-On-Trent South. This also saw Newcastle-under-Lyme become the third-most-marginal Labour seat in England.

In the 2019 UK General Election, Conservative candidates made a net gain of three seats: gaining Stoke-On-Trent North, Stoke-On-Trent Central and Newcastle-under-Lyme. This meant all seats in Staffordshire had a Conservative MP.

The above were all at the expense of Labour seats, in the same way that Labour gained most of its maximal 9 seats in the county, recorded to date, in 1997.

Historic constituencies

Before 1832
Staffordshire County Constituency (2 members)
Lichfield Borough Constituency
Newcastle-under-Lyme Borough Constituency
Stafford Borough Constuency

1832-1885
The county constituency was divided into: 
North Staffordshire
South Staffordshire
Walsall new Borough Constituency
Wolverhampton new Borough Constituency

1885-1918
The county constituencies were divided into: 
Burton (still exists)
Handsworth (until 1918 when it became a Birmingham constituency)
Hanley (until 1950 when it was replaced by Stoke-on-Trent Central)
Kingswinford (until 1950 when it was replaced by Brierley Hill)
Leek (until 1983 when replaced by Staffordshire Moorlands)
Lichfield (until 1950 when it was replaced by Lichfield and Tamworth)
Newcastle-under-Lyme (still exists)
Stafford (until 1950 when it was replaced by Stafford and Stone)
Staffordshire North-West (until 1918)
Staffordshire West (until 1918)
Stoke-upon-Trent (until 1918)
Tamworth (still exists)
Walsall (until 1955)
Wednesbury (until 1974)
West Bromwich (until 1974)
Wolverhampton East (until 1950)
Wolverhampton South (until 1918)
Wolverhampton West (until 1950)

1918-1950 

 Burslem (until 1950 when it was replaced by Stoke-on-Trent North)
 Burton (still exists)
 Cannock (created out of Kingswinford, West Staffordshire and Lichfield)
 Hanley (until 1950 when it was replaced by Stoke-on-Trent Central)
 Kingswinford (until 1950 when it was replaced by Brierley Hill)
Leek (until 1983 when replaced by Staffordshire Moorlands)
Lichfield (until 1950 when it was replaced by Lichfield and Tamworth)
Newcastle-under-Lyme (still exists)
Smethwick (until 1974 when it was replaced by Warley East)
Stafford (until 1950 when it was replaced by Stafford and Stone)
Stoke-on-Trent, Stoke (until 1950 when it was replaced by Stoke-on-Trent Central, Stoke-on-Trent North and Stoke-on-Trent South)
Stone (until 1950 when it was replaced by Stafford and Stone)
Tamworth (still exists)
Walsall (until 1955)
Wednesbury (until 1974)
West Bromwich (until 1974)
Woverhampton Bilston (until 1974)
Wolverhampton East (until 1950)
Wolverhampton West (until 1950)

1950-1983 

 Aldridge-Brownhills (since 1974, created out of Walsall North and Walsall South)
 Brierley Hill (until 1974)
 Burton (still exists)
 Cannock
 Leek
 Lichfield and Tamworth
 Newcastle-under-Lyme
 Smethwick (until 1974)
 South West Staffordshire (1974
 Stafford and Stone
 Stoke-on-Trent Central
Stoke-on-Trent North
Stoke-on-Trent South
 Walsall (until 1955)
 Walsall North (created out of Walsall in 1955)
 Walsall South (created out of Walsall in 1955)
 Wednesbury (until 1974)
 West Bromwich (until 1974)
 West Bromwich East (from 1974)
 West Bromwich West (from 1974)
 Wolverhampton Bilston (until 1974)
 Wolverhampton North East (from 1950)
 Wolverhampton South East (from 1974)
 Wolverhampton South West (from 1950)

1983-1997 

Burton
Cannock and Burntwood
Mid Staffordshire
Newcastle-under-Lyme
South Staffordshire
South West Staffordshire
Stafford
Staffordshire Moorlands
Stoke-on-Trent Central
Stoke-on-Trent North
Stoke-on-Trent South
Stone

1997 to present 

Burton
Cannock Chase
Lichfield
Newcastle-under-Lyme
South Staffordshire
Stafford
Staffordshire Moorlands
Stoke-on-Trent Central
Stoke-on-Trent North
Stoke-on-Trent South
Stone
Tamworth

2010 Boundary changes
Under the Fifth Periodic Review of Westminster constituencies, the Boundary Commission for England decided to retain the 12 constituencies covering Staffordshire for the 2010 election, making minor changes to realign constituency boundaries with the boundaries of current local government wards, and to reduce the electoral disparity between constituencies.

Proposed boundary changes 
See 2023 Periodic Review of Westminster constituencies for further details.

Following the abandonment of the Sixth Periodic Review (the 2018 review), the Boundary Commission for England formally launched the 2023 Review on 5 January 2021. Initial proposals were published on 8 June 2021 and, following two periods of public consultation, revised proposals were published on 8 November 2022. Final proposals will be published by 1 July 2023.

The commission has proposed that Staffordshire be combined with the Black Country as a sub-region of the West Midlands Region, resulting in the creation of a new cross-county boundary constituency named Kingswinford and South Staffordshire, which would include part of the abolished constituency of South Staffordshire; remaining areas of this seat would be combined with parts of the abolished constituency of Stone to form Stone and Great Wyrley.

The following constituencies are proposed:

Containing electoral wards from Cannock Chase

 Cannock Chase

Containing electoral wards from East Staffordshire

 Burton
 Lichfield (part)

Containing electoral wards from Lichfield

 Lichfield (part)
 Tamworth (part)

Containing electoral wards from Newcastle-under-Lyme

 Newcastle-under-Lyme
 Stafford (part)
 Stoke-on-Trent North (part)

Containing electoral wards from South Staffordshire

 Kingswinford and South Staffordshire (part also in the West Midlands metropolitan borough of Dudley)
 Stone and Great Wyrley (part)

Containing electoral wards from Stafford

 Stafford (part)
 Stoke-on-Trent South (part)
 Stone and Great Wyrley (part)

Containing electoral wards from Staffordshire Moorlands

 Staffordshire Moorlands
 Stoke-on-Trent South (part)

Containing electoral wards from Stoke-on-Trent

 Stoke-on-Trent Central
 Stoke-on-Trent North (part)
 Stoke-on-Trent South (part)

Containing electoral wards from Tamworth

 Tamworth (part)

Results history 
Primary data source: House of Commons research briefing - General election results from 1918 to 2019

2019 
The number of votes cast for each political party who fielded candidates in constituencies comprising Staffordshire in the 2019 general election were as follows:

Percentage votes 

11983 & 1987 - SDP-Liberal Alliance

* Included in Other

Seats

Maps

Historical representation by party
A cell marked → (with a different colour background to the preceding cell) indicates that the previous MP continued to sit under a new party name.

1885 to 1918

*Transferred to Warwickshire 1911

1918 to 1950

1950 to 1983
The West Midlands Order 1965 transferred the Dudley area from Worcestershire to Staffordshire and part of the Warley area from Staffordshire to Worcestershire. These changes were incorporated into the new constituency boundaries for the February 1974 general election.

1983 to present

See also
 List of parliamentary constituencies in the West Midlands (region)

Notes

References 

Staffordshire
 
Politics of Staffordshire
Parliamentary constituencies in Staffordshire
Parliamentary constituencies